The Valapattanam River is a 110 km long river which flows through the Kannur district in North Kerala. It is the longest river in the Kannur district.

Course
The Valapattanam River originates from the Brahmagiri hills of Western Ghats in Karnataka. Initially the river flows towards the eastern direction through some villages in the hilly Malenadu region of Karnataka, like Matyani, Birunani, Poradu, Badagarakeri and Kikkod. Later it takes a sharp bend toward the west and flows through a narrow deep valley descending towards the hilly regions of Kannur district. It then flows through the hilly region of Kannur, passing through Manikkadavu, Vattiyamthode, Vayathur, Nuchiyad, Chamathachal, Uchatthu kayam (where the Payyavoor river joins), Madambam The river then enters the Malabar plains where it flows through the towns of Sreekandapuram, Chengalayi, Mungam, Koyyam (where the Bavali river joins), Kandakkai, Mullakkodi Nanichery, Parassinikadavu, Kolachery, Kambil, Narath, Velapuram, Pappinissery, Azhikode and empties into the Arabian Sea at Azhikkal where the Kuppam  river joins the Valapattanam.

Tributaries
 Payyavoor river
 Aralam river 
 Veni river 
 Bavali river
 Pulloopi river
 Mundayapuzha river

References

Rivers of Kannur district